Eric Go Yap (born May 11, 1979) is a Filipino politician serving as the Representative for Benguet's lone congressional district since 2022, and was the district's legislative caretaker from January 2020 until he was elected in his own right. He was a party-list representative for ACT-CIS from 2019 to 2022, and is the chairman of the House Committee on Appropriations since March 2020.

Yap is among the principal authors of House Bill No. 5477 which was signed into law as Republic Act No. 11463 in December 2019 as an act to establish the Malasakit Centers—a one-stop shop for government medical and financial assistance and among the main proponents of House Bill 7778 or the establishment of the Autonomous Region of the Cordillera.

Yap spearheaded various programs in Benguet such as Mobile Tulong, Mobile Oxygen, Youth Assistance Program, and infrastructure projects.

Education
Yap studied in the University of Santo Tomas from 1997 to 2002, where he graduated with a Bachelor of Science in Architecture degree.

Political career

House of Representatives

Representative of ACT-CIS party-list
Yap, along with Jocelyn Pua-Tulfo and Rowena Niña Taduran, were elected as party-list representatives for ACT-CIS in the 2019 elections. Garnering 2.6 million votes (9.45% of the turnout), ACT-CIS topped the party-list election and won the maximum three seats. On the commencement of the 18th congress, Yap was appointed as chairman of the Games and Amusements Committee.

Yap was one of the principal authors of House Bill No. 5477 which was signed into law as Republic Act No. 11463 by President Duterte in December 2019 which institutionalizes the Malasakit Centers—a one-stop shop for government medical and financial assistance.

On March 2, 2020, Yap was appointed as chairman of the Appropriations Committee replacing Isidro Ungab (Davao City–3rd). Yap is the first neophyte congressman and first party-list representative to lead the Committee on Appropriations.

In June 2020, Yap along with Paolo Duterte and Lord Allan Velasco, filed House Bill No. 7031 which aims to rename Ninoy Aquino International Airport (NAIA) to Paliparang Pandaigdig ng Pilipinas. Yap explained that they were "not discrediting the heroic contributions of late Senator Aquino...we just deem it more appropriate for our international airport to bear the name of the country. Instead of it reflecting just one hero, we want it to reflect our everyday heroes—the Filipino people."

ABS-CBN franchise, House leadership crisis
In July 2020, amid the House's hearing on the franchise renewal of ABS-CBN, Yap disclosed that an emissary from the media company attempted to bribe him ₱200 million to vote in favor of the network's franchise renewal. Yap responded that his "principle and vote are not for sale". In an official statement, ABS-CBN denied Yap's allegations, saying: "We believe in the process and we have participated in the process". Yap later clarified that "he was not accusing ABS-CBN", explaining that he received a phone call from "someone claiming to be an ABS-CBN emissary", and that he was not able to verify if the caller's claims were true. On July 10, Yap, together with 69 other members of the Committee on Legislative Franchises, voted to deny the renewal of ABS-CBN's franchise.

During the speakership crisis between Alan Peter Cayetano and Lord Allan Velasco, the former met with Paolo Duterte and Yap. However, Yap clarified that he did not side with either of the two. On October 13, when Cayetano and Velasco both claimed to be the speaker, Yap requested the rivals to settle the issue or else he, as chairman of the Committee on Appropriations, would handle the deliberations for the 2021 national budget. When Velasco replaced Cayetano, Yap was allowed to keep his committee chairmanship. On November 18, he became a vice chair of the Committee on Accounts where Paolo Duterte was the new chairman.

Legislative caretaker of Benguet
After the death of Benguet representative Nestor Fongwan Sr. on December 18, 2019, Yap was appointed as the legislative caretaker of the district on January 20, 2020. The appointment became controversial as Yap is not from Benguet or Cordillera. The Sangguniang Panlalawigan (SP) of Benguet has passed a resolution asking Congress to conduct a special election to fill the vacancy in the House. In May 2020, the SP passed another resolution making Yap an "adopted son of Benguet" in recognition for his sincere support for the province.

One of Yap's plans for Benguet was to re-nationalize Benguet General Hospital (BeGH) and increase its bed capacity. In September 2020, he attended the opening ceremony of BeGH's molecular biology laboratory, which he personally funded. However, the project was criticized for bearing Yap's name as Benguet General Hospital Molecular Biology Laboratory Eric Yap Building. Yap said he was unaware that the hospital management named the laboratory after him. He then asked the management to remove his name from the laboratory.

Yap was known to visit remote areas of Benguet to extend public service and implement projects.

In October 2021, presidential aspirant and Senator Manny Pacquiao accused Yap of being involved in alleged overpriced slope protection and flood control projects in Benguet. Yap lamented that his political opponents were attempting to discredit him by using Pacquiao. A few days after the accusation, Benguet mayors came to Yap's defense and expressed dismay at Pacquiao's pronouncements saying:

Committee assignments and House positions
Yap served on the following House committees and in the following House positions.

18th congress (2019–2022) – Chair of the Committee on Appropriations (since March 2, 2020); chair of the Committee on Games and Amusements (until March 2, 2020); a vice chair of the Committees on Games and Amusements (since March 2, 2020), Good Government and Public Accountability, Government Enterprises and Privatization, Ways and Means, and Accounts (since November 18, 2020); member of the Committees on Banks and Financial Intermediaries; Energy; Flagship Programs and Projects; Foreign Affairs; Higher and Technical Education; Justice; Legislative Franchises; Overseas Workers Affairs; Public Accounts; Public Works and Highways; and Transportation.

Congressman of Benguet
Yap was elected as Representative for Benguet's lone congressional district by a landslide over his closest rival, Itogon mayor Victor Palangdan in the 2022 May elections.

Personal life
Yap is a close friend of Paolo Duterte.

Yap was a judge at the finals night of Miss Universe Philippines 2020, the pageant's first edition.

References

External links
 Hon. Yap, Eric Go on House of Representatives

1979 births
Living people
21st-century Filipino politicians
Party-list members of the House of Representatives of the Philippines